King Rama VI Museum is a military history museum in Phra Nakhon District, Bangkok, Thailand, located within the Territorial Defense Command. The museum is dedicated to King Vajiravudh.

External links
Tour Bangkok Legacies on King Rama VI Museum

Museums in Bangkok